Harry James Pearce (July 12, 1889 – January 8, 1942) was a Major League Baseball second baseman who played for the Philadelphia Phillies from  to .

External links 

1889 births
1942 deaths
Philadelphia Phillies players
Major League Baseball third basemen
Baseball players from Pennsylvania
Dayton Veterans players
Jersey City Skeeters players
Wilmington Chicks players